Glyn Keith Murray Mason, 2nd Baron Blackford,  (29 May 1887 – 31 December 1972) was a British businessman, magistrate, and Conservative politician.

Background
Mason was born in 1887 to Edith Mason née Affleck and William Mason (1862–1947). His father, created a baronet in 1918 and 1st Baron Blackford in 1935, was a barrister, a magistrate, and Lord of the Manor.

First World War
Mason served as a colonel in the 14th Hussars, seeing action in World War I in France, Salonica and Palestine. He was awarded the Distinguished Service Order in 1916.

Career
At the general election in November 1922, Sir Glyn was elected unopposed as Conservative Member of Parliament (MP) for Croydon North, then in Surrey. He kept his seat in the 1923, 1924, 1929, 1931, and 1935 general elections, facing Gilbert Foan for the Labour Party on three occasions. On 1 June 1940, Mason resigned his seat by accepting the stewardship of the Manor of Northstead.

During World War II, Mason served in the City of London Home Guard. He became a Justice of the Peace in 1946 in Somerset and succeeded his father as second Baron Blackford in 1947. He was a Lieutenant of the City of London from 1951 to 1958. Lord Blackford was a successful businessman, becoming deputy chairman of the Midland Bank, and Chairman, then Hon. President of the Guardian Assurance Company.

In the House of Lords, Lord Blackford was Deputy Speaker. In the 1950s, he was considered for the post of Chancellor of the Primrose League, a conservative-leaning political and social organisation in honour of Benjamin Disraeli. He was appointed a Companion of the Order of the British Empire (CBE) in 1962.

Family
Mason married Grace Keen who died in 1972, with whom he had three children. His second son, Keith, succeeded him as Baron Blackford.

References

External links 
 

1887 births
1972 deaths
14th King's Hussars officers
2
Mason, Glyn
Commanders of the Order of the British Empire
Politics of the London Borough of Croydon
Companions of the Distinguished Service Order
Mason, Glyn
Mason, Glyn
Mason, Glyn
Mason, Glyn
Mason, Glyn
Mason, Glyn
UK MPs who inherited peerages
British Army personnel of World War I